Taare Zameen Par is an Indian kids singing reality show on StarPlus. It premiered on 2 November 2020 and ended on 30 January 2021. The series was hosted by the child actress Aakriti Sharma and singer Sugandha Mishra with Shankar Mahadevan, Jonita Gandhi and Tony Kakkar as the mentors.

Format
The singing show was initially designed for 20 children who are mentored throughout their progress without elimination process till finale. However, after few weeks, the show had a change its format and follows the elimination process where each day one low scorer is selected and every Saturday all low scorers compete to make their place. On that day, the lowest scorer is eliminated.

Audition
The auditions were held digitally in the month of March 2020 where first 500 participants were recognised.

Mentors
The show had composer and singer Shankar Mahadevan, playback singer Jonita Gandhi and composer, lyricist, singer and producer Tony Kakkar for mentorship.

Production
The title of the series was taken from Aamir Khan's 2007 film Taare Zameen Par after getting rights from them.

In conversation with The Times of India, Sugandha said, "I share a strong connection with kids and really enjoy being around them. I decided to be part of the show because of its unique concept. I thoroughly enjoy hosting as much as I love acting and over the years, I have developed a certain penchant for hosting television shows. I am happy to be a part of a prestigious show and looking forward to witnessing some of the finest performances in this show by a set of equally dynamic kids.”

Season 1
Judges
Tony KakkarJonita GandhiShankar Mahadevan
Host
Sugandha MishraAakriti Sharma

Top 20 Contestants

Guests
Udit Narayan 
Rupali Ganguly as Anupamaa
Mika Singh
Devoleena Bhattacharjee as Gopi Modi
Rupal Patel as Kokila Modi
Bhoomi Trivedi
Gurdeep Singh
Shaan
Siddharth Mahadevan
Shivam Mahadevan
Zeenat Aman
Richa Sharma
 Badshah
Kanika Kapoor
Terence Lewis
Hemant Brijwasi
Sonakshi Kar
L. V. Revanth
Neha Kakkar
Rohanpreet Singh
Afsana Khan
Anjana Padmanabhan
Sukhwinder Singh

See also
Sa Re Ga Ma Pa L'il Champs
Superstar Singer
The Voice India Kids
Indian Idol Junior
Love Me India

References

Hindi-language television shows
2020 Indian television series debuts
Indian reality television series